MV Gustaf III is a steamship that still operates in Sweden today as of 2021.

History 

In 1951, the central library on Lidingö with county librarian  applied for a grant for a new outreach cultural project with a book bus and book boat. In 1952, the application for the book boat was granted by the county council and Elise Adelsköld was hired by HMS Rindö from the coastal artillery. On May 5, 1953, the first trip for the book boat departed, which was the first book boat in Stockholm County. 

In 1974, the Gustaf III was bought by Rederi AB Sommar & Sol, which renamed the ship the Gustaf III after renovation and rebuilding of the ship. 

In 1995, Ångfartygs AB Strömma Kanal bought the vessel. She has her berth at Nybroviken in Stockholm.

References 

 HMS RINDÖ (1912)

External links 

 Charterbåt M/S Gustaf III | Middagskryssning 
 Rent M/S Gustaf III in Stockholm | Stromma.com
 fartyg
 Skärgårdsbåtar.se – Rindö (1912)
 Bokbåten i Stockholms skärgård 1953 – 1981 PDF

Gustaf III
Gustaf III
Gustaf III